Caracole is a turning maneuver on horseback in dressage and, previously, in military tactics.

Caracole or Caracoles may also refer to:
 Caracoles, a mining town in Antofagasta in the 19th century
 Karakoa, large outrigger warships from the Philippines
 Caracole, a 1985 novel by Edmund White